Pavel Mezlík (born 25 June 1983) is a Czech football player.

Mezlík started his football career in Rudíkov. In 1998, he moved to FC Zbrojovka Brno. On 22 May 1999, at the age of 15, he appeared in a league match against FC Karviná, becoming the youngest player in the history of Gambrinus liga. He played in Brno until 2008, with the exceptions of loans at FC Hradec Králové and Vysočina Jihlava in 2006 and 2007. In 2008 Mezlík moved to SK Dynamo České Budějovice where he plays to date.

Mezlík played for Czech youth national teams since the under-15 level.

References

External links
Player profile at FC Zbrojovka Brno official website 

Czech footballers
1983 births
Living people
Czech First League players
FC Zbrojovka Brno players
FC Hradec Králové players
FC Vysočina Jihlava players
SK Dynamo České Budějovice players
Sportspeople from Třebíč
Association football midfielders